Ense petit placidam sub libertate quietem is a Latin passage and the official motto of the  U.S. Commonwealth of Massachusetts and the University of Massachusetts Amherst. The phrase is often loosely translated into English as "By the sword we seek peace, but peace only under liberty."  The literal translation, however, is "she seeks with the sword a quiet peace under liberty."  The "she" in question refers to the word manus from the full phrase manus haec inimica tyrannis ense petit placidam sub libertate quietem, which means "this hand, an enemy to tyrants, seeks with the sword a quiet peace under liberty."

It was written c. 1660 by English soldier-statesman Algernon Sidney, who was an opponent of Charles II and who was later executed for treason. The motto was first adopted in 1775 by the Massachusetts General Court (the official name of the state legislature) and applied to the temporary seal of Massachusetts. On December 13, 1780, the legislature approved its application to the current Great Seal of Massachusetts.

See also

List of Massachusetts state symbols
Flag of Massachusetts
List of U.S. state and territory mottos

References
 Crampton, William G. Webster's Concise Encyclopedia of Flags & Coats of Arms. Crescent Books: 1985. .
 Zieber, Eugene, Heraldry in America: The Civic Armorial Bearings of American States. Greenwich House: 1976.

External links
The History of the Arms and Great Seal of the Commonwealth of Massachusetts

Latin mottos
State mottos of the United States
Symbols of Massachusetts
Peace in culture
Liberty symbols